Mera Fauji Calling is a 2021 Hindi-language action drama film written and directed by Aaryaan Saxena and produced by Vikram Singh and Ovez Shaikh under the banners of Running Horses Films and Ovez Productions. The film bankrolled by Jimmy Satish Asija, has ensemble which includes Sharman Joshi, Ranjha Vikram Singh, Bidita Bag, Mahi Soni, Mugdha Godse, Zarina Wahab, and Shishir Sharma. The film showcases the story of a soldier who sacrifices his life in an attack and the struggle of his family after the attack. Inspired by aftermath of 2019 Pulwama attack, it also explores the various aspects of the life of soldiers and the struggle of their families.

The film was released in cinemas on 11 March 2021.

Cast 

 Sharman Joshi as Abhishek
 Vikram Singh as Rajveer Singh
 Bidita Bag as Sakshi Singh
 Mugdha Godse as Paridhi
 Zarina Wahab as Maa ji, Rajveer Singh's mother
 Shishir Sharma as Major Roy
 Mahi Soni as Aaradhya
 Ritu Shree as Bhoomi
 Abhijita Kashyap as Kriti
 Sidhi Jain as Suman
 Rizwan Kalshyan as Jai Singh

Soundtrack 

The film's music was composed by Harpriet Singh Vig, Sajjad Ali Chandwani and Vijay Verma while lyrics written by Pooja Saini, Traditional, A. M. Turaz, Rajesh Manthan and Shakeel Azmi.

References

External links 
 
 Mera Fauji Calling on Bollywood Hungama

2021 films
Indian action drama films
Films about terrorism in India
Films not released in theaters due to the COVID-19 pandemic
Indian Army in films
Indian films based on actual events